Maria Vyacheslavovna Kazakova (born 2 July 1988 in Moscow, Russian SFSR, Soviet Union) is a Russian sprint canoer who has competed since the late 2000s. She won the bronze medal in the C-1 200 m event at the 2010 ICF Canoe Sprint World Championships in Poznań. At the 2011 Canoe Sprint European Championships in Belgrade she won her first gold medal during the C-1 200m race.

References
2010 ICF Canoe Sprint World Championships results from tsn.ca. – accessed 23 August 2010.

Living people
Russian female canoeists
Year of birth missing (living people)
ICF Canoe Sprint World Championships medalists in Canadian